Rajgir, meaning "The City of Kings," is a historic town in the district of Nalanda in Bihar, India. As the ancient seat and capital of the Haryanka dynasty, the Pradyota dynasty, the Brihadratha dynasty and the Mauryan Empire, as well as the dwelling ground of such historical figures as The Buddha and  The Mahavira, the city holds a place of prominence in Hindu, Buddhist and Jain scriptures. As of 2011, the population of the town was reported to be 71,459 while the population in the community development block was about 88,500.  

Rajgir was the first capital of the ancient kingdom of Magadha, a state that would eventually evolve into the Mauryan Empire. It finds mention in India's renowned literary epic, the Mahabharata, through its king Jarasandha. The town's date of origin is unknown, although ceramics dating to about 1000 BC have been found in the city. The 2,500-year-old cyclopean wall is also located in the region.  

The town is also notable in Jainism and Buddhism. It was the birthplace of the 20th Jain Tirthankar Munisuvrata, and is closely associated with the Mahavira and Gautama Buddha. Both Mahavira and Buddha taught their beliefs in Rajgir during the 6th and 5th century BC, and the Buddha was offered a forest monastery here by the king Bimbisara. As such, the city of Rajgir became one of the Buddha's most important preaching locations. 

The ancient Nalanda university was located in the vicinity of Rajgir, and the contemporary Nalanda University named after it was founded in 2010 nearby. The town is also famed for its natural springs and towering hills that dominate the landscape.

Etymology 
The name Rajgir (Sanskrit Rājagṛha, Pali: Rajagriha), literally meaning "royal mountain" comes from the historic  Rājagṛiha, meaning "house of the king" or "royal house". It has also historically been known as Vasumati, Brahdrathapura, Grivraja/Girivraja and Kusagrapura. Girivraja means an enclosure of hills.

History

The epic Mahabharata calls it Girivraja and recounts the story of its king, Jarasandha, and his battle with the Pandava brothers and their allies Krishna. Mahabharata recounts a wrestling match between Bhima (one of the Pandavas) and Jarasandha, the then king of Magadha. Jarasandha was invincible as his body could rejoin any dismembered limbs. According to the legend, Bhima split Jarasandha into two and threw the two halves facing opposite to each other so that they could not join. There is a famous Jarasandha's Akhara (the place where martial arts are practised).

Rajgir was the capital of Haryanka dynasty kings Bimbisara (558–491 BC) and Ajatashatru (492–460 BC). Ajatashatru kept his father Bimbisara in captivity here. The sources do not agree on which of the Buddha's royal contemporaries, Bimbisara and Ajatashatru, was responsible for its construction. It was the ancient capital city of the Magadha kings until the 5th century BC when Udayin (460–440 BC), son of Ajatashatru, moved the capital to Pataliputra (modern Patna). Shishunaga (413-395 BC) founded Shishunaga dynasty in 413 BC with Rajgir as its initial capital before it was moved to Pataliputra.

It is associated with the founders of both the religions: Jainism and Buddhism, associated with both the historical Arihant Shraman Bhagawan Mahavira and Buddha.

It was here that Gautama Buddha spent several months meditating, and preaching at Gridhra-kuta, ('Hill of the Vultures'). He also delivered some of his famous sermons and initiated king Bimbisara of Magadha and others to Buddhism. It was here that Budhha delivered his famous Atanatiya Sutra. On one of the hills is the Saptaparni Cave where the First Buddhist Council was held under the leadership of Maha Kassapa.

Mahavira, the 24th Tirthankara spent fourteen years of his life at Rajgir and Nalanda, spending Chaturmas (i.e. 4 months of the rainy season) at a single place in Rajgir (Rajgruhi) and the rest in the places in the vicinity. It was the capital of one of his Shravaks (follower) King Shrenik. Thus Rajgir is also of religious importance to Jains. The twentieth Jain Tirthankara, Munisuvrata is supposed to have been born here. An ancient temple (about 1200 years old) dedicated to Munisuvrat Bhagwan is also present here along with many other Jain temples. This temple is also a place for four Kalyanakas of Bhagwan Munisuvratnath.It is also mentioned in Jain and Buddhist scriptures, which give a series of place-names, but without geographical context.  The attempt to locate these places is based largely on reference to them and to other locations in the works of Chinese Buddhist pilgrims, particularly Faxian and Xuanzang. It is on the basis of Xuanzang in particular that the site is divided into Old and New Rajgir. The former lies within a valley and is surrounded by low-lying hills, Rajgir Hills. It is defined by an earthen embankment (the Inner Fortification), with which is associated the Outer Fortification, a complex of cyclopean walls that runs (with large breaks) along the crest of the hills. New Rajgir is defined by another, larger, embankment outside the northern entrance of the valley and next to the modern town.

Geography and climate
The modern town is situated close to the Rajgir hills while the valley is surrounded by seven hills: Vaibhara, Ratna, Saila, Sona, Udaya, Chhatha, and Vipula. River Panchane flows through the outskirts of the town.

 Summer temperature: maximum 44 °C (111.2 °F), minimum 20 °C (68 °F)
 Winter temperature: maximum 28 °C (82.4 °F), minimum 6 °C (42.8 °F)
 Rainfall: 1,860 mm (mid-June to mid-September)
 Dry/warm season: March to October

Rajgir Wildlife Sanctuary 

The landscape of Rajgir or Pant WLS is uneven terrain enclosed by five hills; Ratnagiri, Vipulgiri, Vaibhagiri, Songiri and Udaygiri. It is situated in Nalanda Forest Division covering an area of 35.84 km2 under the Nalanda district administration. This wildlife sanctuary, notified in 1978, represents a remnant patch of forests nestled in the Rajgir hills within the south Gangetic Plain.

It is home to a number of wild animals including: mammals – blue bull (Boselaphus tragocamelus), chital or spotted deer (Axis axis), Indian crested porcupine (Hystrix indica), small Indian civet (Viverricula indica), jungle cat (Felis chaus); birds – painted spurfowl (Galloperdix lunulata), Eurasian thick knee (Burhinus oedicnemus), painted sandgrouse (Pterocles indicus); reptiles and amphibians – Bengal monitor (Varanus bengalensis), Indian bullfrog (Hoplobatrachus tigerinus), Jerdon's bullfrog (Hoplobatrachus crassus), ornate narrow-mouthed frog (Microhyla ornata), and Indian tree frog (Polypedates maculatus).

Demographics
According to 2011 Indian Census, Rajgir had a total population of 41,587, of which 21,869 were males and 19,718 were females. The population within the age group of 0 to 6 years was 6,922. The total number of literates in Rajgir was 24,121, which constituted 58.0% of the population with male literacy of 65.4% and female literacy of 49.8%. The effective literacy rate of the 7+ population of Rajgir was 69.6%, of which the male literacy rate was 78.1% and the female literacy rate was 60.1%. The Scheduled Castes and Scheduled Tribes population was 11,724 and 42 respectively. Rajgir had 7030 households in 2011.

Tourism

The main tourist attractions include the ancient city walls from Ajatashatru's period, Bimbisar's Jail, Jarasandh's Akhara, Gridhra-kuta, ('Hill of the Vultures'), Son Bhandar Caves and the Jain temples on the five peaks.
Another major attraction is the peace pagoda, Vishwa Shanti Stupa, built-in 1969, one of the 80 peace pagodas in the world, to spread the message of peace and non-violence. It is the oldest peace pagoda in India. The rope-way that leads to it is another attraction, which was gifted by Japanese spiritual leader Fuji Guruji in the 1960s.

A new rope way has been planned.

Rajgir has hot water springs, locally known as Brahmakund, a sacred place for Hindus where water from seven different springs (Saptarshi) merge and is notable for its healing effects. 

There is a Japanese temple beside the Venu Vana, an artificial forest with historical associations to Buddha and the kings of the region. Other places of interest include the Rajgir Heritage Museum, the Sariputta Stupa, Ghora Katora Lake, and the Rajgir glass bridge.
The Son Bhandar caves are situated in Rajgir. The caves are concerned with Jainism and are considered to belong to 3–4 century AD. After Cunningham's inspection, several scholars visited this place and some had opinions to concern with Buddhism. After some time all Buddhism connections were refused because of an inscription found on the southern wall of a cave. According to this inscription these caves were built by inspiration of a Jain Muni Vair for Jain ascetics. Sculptures of Teerthankaras were also carved in these caves. From an architectural aspect; these caves are analogous to Nagarjuni cave and Barabar Caves caves of Mauryan era. Therefore, it can be concluded that construction time should not differ much from the above-mentioned caves. 

These caves should be related to Digambar sect of Jainism as Xuanzang wrote in his book about Vaibhar Hill of Rajgir that the place was occupied by Digambar Jain monks for meditation purposes. After some centuries these caves were converted by Hindus as Vishnu sculpture was also found from the mound of a cave.

Transportation
Bihar State Tourism Development Corporation provides travel facility from state capital Patna to visit Bodh circuit (Bodhgaya, Rajgir, Nalanda, Vaishali, Kesaria, Lumbini, Kushinagar, Sarnath), Jain Circuit (Rajgir, Pawapuri) and Sikh Circuit in Bihar. 
 Air: The nearest is Gaya International Airport, Gaya which is 78 km which is connected to International Destinations like Bangkok, Columbo, etc. Another airport is at Patna 101 km.  Air India, Indigo, Jet Airways and Go Air connect Patna to Kolkata, Bengaluru, Mumbai, Delhi, Ranchi and Lucknow.
 Rail: Rajgir railway station connects the city to other parts of country yet the nearest convenient railhead is at Gaya Junction railway station 78 km. The Bakhtiyarpur-Gaya line provides improved rail connectivity to many places. It is one of the destinations of the prestigious Buddhist pilgrimage train of Indian Railways-Mahaparinirvan Express.
 Road: Rajgir is connected by road to Patna – 110 km, Nalanda – 12 km, Gaya – 78 km, Pawapuri – 19 km, Bihar Sharif – 25 km, etc. NH 120, transverses the city of Rajgir, connecting it with Bodhgaya, Gaya, Nalanda, Bihar Sharif and further to Patna. State Highway 71 also passes through Rajgir connecting it with Giriyak, Islampur and Jahanabad.
 Bus: Regular buses are available from all the above said points to Rajgir.
 Local Transport: Taxis and Buses and Tongas are available.

Economy
Located in Patna division, this Nagar Panchayat type of municipal council mainly depends upon tourism and is supplemented by agriculture. A number of resorts and hotels are located in Rajgir to serve the tourists. In addition, Rajgir is located near the tourist spots like Nalanda, Pawapuri and Kundalpur. 

Rajgir ranks top in Bihar, in reference to revenue collected by tourism.

An ordinance factory for defence forces is located in the city. 
Rajgir is also home to Bihar Police Academy.
RTC CRPF – Rajgir is also home to the Recruit Training centre of the Central Reserve Police Force for three states namely Bihar, Jharkhand and West Bengal.
Government of Bihar has acquired 100 acres of land to build an IT city near Nalanda university and also develop India's first multi-media hub which will provide advanced courses in different spheres of IT.
Rajgir Film City is an integrated film studio complex. Spread over 20 acres, it is the second largest integrated film city in Bihar. It is being built by the Bihar government since 2017.

Sports 
Nalanda International Cricket Stadium is a proposed cricket stadium in the city. In 2013, it was announced by the Chief Minister of Bihar Nitish Kumar that an international cricket stadium will be constructed at Rajgir in Bihar's Nalanda district.

Nalanda University
Nalanda University, a modern university that is based on the famous university and Buddhist monastery of ancient India, has been established with its campus in Rajgir. It began its first academic session on 1 September 2014.

Events
 Rajgir Mahotsav
 Purushottam Maas Mela
 Sariputta World Peace Walk
 Makar Sankranti Mela

Notable people
Bimbisara, ruler of Haryanaka Dynasty
Ajatashatru, ruler of Haryanaka Dynasty
Udayin, ruler of Haryanaka Dynasty
Sariputta, one of the two chief disciples of Budhha
Jivaka, a physician and contemporary of Bimbisara and Buddha
Abhay K, poet, diplomat, editor, translator, ambassador, artist
Satyadev Narayan Arya, Governor of Haryana, former 8-time MLA from Rajgir and former Minister of Mines and Geology of Bihar
Kaushal Kishore, politician and current MLA, Rajgir

See also 

 Rajgir hills
 Atanatiya Sutta
 Rajgir Mahotsav
 Legendary kings of Magadha
 Bhadda Kundalakesa
 Nahub
 Kurkihar hoard
 Avanti-Magadhan Wars

References

Further reading

External links

 Bihar state tourism development corporation – Rajgir
 Places to visit in Rajgir

 
Cities and towns in Nalanda district
Buddhist pilgrimage sites in India
Tourist attractions in Nalanda district
Hot springs of India
Former capital cities in India
Buddhist sites in Bihar
Jain pilgrimage sites
Landforms of Bihar
Jain temples in Bihar
3rd-century Jain temples
Indo-Aryan archaeological sites
Ancient Indian cities